Gerlafingen railway station is a railway station in the municipality of Gerlafingen, in the Swiss canton of Solothurn. It is an intermediate stop on the standard gauge Solothurn–Langnau line of BLS AG.

Services 
The following services stop at Gerlafingen:

References

External links 
 
 

Railway stations in the canton of Solothurn
BLS railway stations